Gustav Valsvik (born 26 May 1993) is a Norwegian footballer who plays as a defender who plays for Strømsgodset.

Career 
Born in Vik, Valsvik started his career in the local club Vik IL before he joined Sogndal ahead of the 2010 season. In his first season, Valsvik played nine matches in the First Division. Following Sogndal's promotion, Valsvik played seven matches in Tippeligaen in 2011, and the next season he was playing regularly in Sogndal's central defence.

He signed a three-year contract with Strømsgodset in July 2014, for an undisclosed sum.

In July 2016, Valsvik transferred to German 2. Bundesliga club Eintracht Braunschweig. On 18 January 2019, Valsvik transferred to Rosenborg on a four years contract.

International career 
Valsvik first represented Norway when he played for the under-16 team in 2009. He has later represented Norway at every level up to under-21 level. On 26 March 2017, Valsvik made his debut for the senior Norway national football team.

Career statistics

References

1993 births
Living people
People from Vik
Association football defenders
Norwegian footballers
Norwegian expatriate footballers
Norwegian expatriate sportspeople in Germany
Norway youth international footballers
Norway under-21 international footballers
Norway international footballers
Sogndal Fotball players
Strømsgodset Toppfotball players
Eintracht Braunschweig players
Rosenborg BK players
Stabæk Fotball players
Norwegian First Division players
Eliteserien players
2. Bundesliga players
Expatriate footballers in Germany
3. Liga players
Sportspeople from Vestland